St Peter's College is a Catholic Integrated co-educational College Year 7–13 of approximately 678 students. It is located in the northern Palmerston North suburb of Milson in New Zealand. The school's campus includes the historic St Anskar's Chapel, which was given to the school by the Dannevirke Catholic community.

School Leadership
Margaret Leamy is Principal, and the school is divided into a junior school (years 7-10) and a senior school (years 11-13) with each group having a head boy and head girl with the latter being school-representative.

Houses
Students and teachers alike are divided into four houses, named after the first four bishops or archbishops of Wellington. The houses compete annually for the House Shield, involving many house led competitions, like Parables (a short drama based on a Biblical parable), House Kapa Haka, House Singing and so on, as well as serving an organisational purpose for the students:
Redwood (Red)- Named for Francis Redwood.
Viard (Green)- Named for Philippe Viard.
O'Shea (Blue)- Named for Thomas O'Shea. 
McKeefry (Yellow)- Named for Cardinal McKeefry.

Sporting Rivalries
St Peter's Rugby Union 1st XV plays traditional matches against four other Catholic Schools. The schools are: St John's College, Hastings; Francis Douglas Memorial College, New Plymouth; Cullinane College, Wanganui (formerly St Augustines); and Chanel College, Masterton. Traditional games are played on an annual basis, with home and away legs alternating.

Alumni

The following persons were educated at St. Peter's College, Marist Brother's High School, St. Joseph's High School and St. Patrick's Intermediate, Palmerston North, New Zealand.

 Vaine Greig (born 1991) - New Zealand representative rugby union player.
 Mike McRedmond (born 1958) - cycling coach and former racing cyclist olympian.
 Brian Molloy (botanist)   (1930 – 2022) plant ecologist, conservationist, and rugby union player representing New Zealand (Marist Brothers).
 Tim Wilkinson - professional golfer on the PGA Tour
 Simon Power - CEO of TVNZ; former banker, politician, Member of Parliament and cabinet minister.
 Arthur Singe (1898-1936) - rugby league player representing New Zealand in 1925 (Marist Brothers).

Notes

Sources

 Pat Gallager, The Marist Brothers in New Zealand Fiji & Samoa 1876-1976, New Zealand Marist Brothers' Trust Board, Tuakau, 1976.

External links
 St Peter's College Website
 New Zealand Press Council

Secondary schools in Manawatū-Whanganui
Catholic secondary schools in New Zealand
Educational institutions established in 1974
Schools in Palmerston North